Vika Jigulina (born Victoria Corneva; February 18, 1986) is a Moldovan-born record producer, singer, and DJ of Bulgarian and Russian descent.

Life and career
Victoria Corneva was born in Cahul, Moldavian SSR (Moldova). She is Bulgarian through her mother’s side and Russian through her father’s side. In 2000, Jigulina moved to Timișoara, Romania and continued her studies while there. She worked in various local clubs and eventually worked in the capital city Bucharest. She landed weekly shows on Romanian radio stations that gained her nationwide exposure and fame. In 2010, Jigulina officially became a Romanian citizen. She is currently working as a disk jockey for Radio 21 Romania and Vibe FM.

Jigulina has made mixes with ATB, Tomcraft, Steve Angello, Sebastian Ingrosso and other artists. She is widely known as the vocalist in the international dance hit "Stereo Love" by Romanian producer and musician Edward Maya. Jigulina's first solo single, "Memories," was released on September 29, 2012.

She has also appeared on the cover of the Romanian edition of Playboy in March 2012.

Jigulina was chosen to dub Althea's voice in the animated movie Onward.

Singles

As lead artist

As featured artist

References

External links
 
 Vika Jigulina at Cat Music
 Vika Jigulina at Mayavin Records

1986 births
Living people
People from Cahul
Romanian DJs
Romanian dance musicians
English-language singers from Romania
Moldovan emigrants to Romania
Naturalised citizens of Romania
21st-century Romanian singers
21st-century Romanian women singers
Women DJs
Electronic dance music DJs
Romanian people of Bulgarian descent
Romanian people of Russian descent